Major Oliver Stewart MC AFC (1896-1976) was a World War I flying ace credited with five aerial victories. Post war, he had a long and distinguished career as a writer.

World War I service
Stewart was commissioned a second lieutenant in the Middlesex Regiment in October 1914. He transferred to the Royal Flying Corps in 1915. After a brief stint with 22 Squadron, he moved on in 1917 to 54 Squadron to fly a Sopwith Pup. He gained a flight commandership, a nickname (Stewpot), five victories, and a Military Cross while with the squadron. The victories came between 6 April and 25 September 1917; the MC came on 17 September.

He then returned to England, was promoted to major in June 1918, and given command of the Aeroplane and Armament Experimental Establishment. He received an Air Force Cross for his efforts.

Post war
He retired from service in 1921, to begin a new career as an aviation journalist. From 1939 through 1962, he was the editor of Aeronautics magazine. His books included Aerobatics: A Simple Explanation of Aerial Evolutions, Of Flight and Flyers, and his autobiography, Words and Music of a Mechanical Man.

Sources of information

References
Above the Trenches: a Complete Record of the Fighter Aces and Units of the British Empire Air Forces 1915–1920. Christopher F. Shores, Norman L. R. Franks, Russell Guest. Grub Street, 1990. , .

1896 births
1976 deaths
Royal Flying Corps officers
English autobiographers
Middlesex Regiment officers
British World War I flying aces
Recipients of the Military Cross
Recipients of the Air Force Cross (United Kingdom)